Jiuxiang Scenic Region is located in Jiuxiang Yi and Hui Autonomous Township of Yiliang County 90 km away from central Kunming, Yunnan Province, China.

It is famous for its caves, mountains, rivers, deep valleys, minority customs and cultures.

Jiuxiang Scenic Region consists of 5 major scenic spots: 
Diehong Bridge 
Sanjiao Cave
Dasha Dam
Alulong
Mingyue Lake.

Diehong Bridge itself includes six major scenic spots: the Green Shady Valley, the White Elephant Cave, the Goddess Cave, the Lying Dragon Cave, the Bat Cave and the Tourist Cableway.

References 
 https://web.archive.org/web/20080516222412/http://www.kmtrip.net/en/city/kunming/attraction/jiuxiang.htm

Geography of Kunming
Tourist attractions in Yunnan
Karst caves
Karst formations of Yunnan